Sysonby (1902–1906) was an American Thoroughbred racehorse. He won every start easily, except one,  at distances from one mile to two and a quarter miles. His superiority as a two and three-year-old was unchallenged during his short career of 15 race starts.

Background
Foaled in Kentucky, Sysonby was a bay son of the 1885 Epsom Derby winner, Melton, out of the English mare Optime by Orme (by the undefeated Ormonde). The mating of Melton and Optime was arranged by Marcus Daly, who was involved with the Anaconda Copper Mine.  Daly died before Optime, stabled in England, foaled.  His stock, including the still pregnant Optime, was brought to New York to be auctioned.  James R. Keene purchased Optime for $6,600, sending her to his Castleton Stud in Kentucky, which he rarely visited.

Apparently Optime's foal, observed in his paddock, was anything but inspiring. Considered unattractive and small, as well as slow, young Sysonby was to be sent back to England for sale.  But Keene's trainer, the well-regarded James G. Rowe, Sr., had seen Sysonby in action during some early trials. When it was time for the yearlings to be sent away, Rowe, a leading trainer who had once been a leading jockey (guiding Harry Bassett to his Saratoga Cup win amongst many other successes), covered Sysonby in blankets, convincing Keene he was too ill to make the long ocean journey.

Racing career
In the care of Rowe, Sysonby won everything Rowe entered him in by sizable margins, with the exception of the Futurity Stakes (USA), where he came in an unaccountable third, beaten by the filly Tradition and the filly Artful. Artful ranked 94th in the top 100 U.S. Thoroughbred champions of the 20th century by Blood-Horse magazine). Rowe saw Sysonby's groom exhibiting a  large sum of money, and the groom admitted he'd been bribed to drug Sysonby before the race.

If not drugged, nothing beat Sysonby.  The turf writer Neil Newman ranked Sysonby as one of the three best colts he'd ever seen. The other two were Colin (also trained by Rowe) and Man o' War.

Sysonby was the top money earner of 1905. Average winning margin was 4 ¼ lengths. Was ahead at every point of every race, except at the quarter call in the Brighton Junior Stakes, and in the stretch of the Futurity.

Death
At four years and four months of age, Sysonby died.  He had broken out with bloody sores all over his body, having contracted a serious disease called variola, and it proved fatal. Sysonby died on June 17, 1906, in his stall at Sheepshead Bay from sepsis brought on by an illness consisting of multiple skin lesions, fever and profound muscle wasting, now thought to be variola. After his death, his owner Keene donated his remains to New York City's American Museum of Natural History to become part of the Chubb series of skeletons as studies in anatomy and locomotion.  Sysonby was in the storage area of the Museum with other horses of the Chubb Collection.  These other horses include, General Philip Sheridan's American Civil War steed, Winchester, General Robert E. Lee's Traveller, Comanche ( the sole survivor of the Battle of the Little Big Horn), and Roy Rogers' Trigger. At this time, however, Sysonby is currently on loan to the International Museum of the Horse in Lexington, KY as part of a Horse and Man sculpture by Chubb.

Honors
Sysonby was inducted into the National Museum of Racing and Hall of Fame in Saratoga Springs, New York, in 1956. In the list of the top 100 U.S. Thoroughbred champions of the 20th Century by Blood-Horse magazine, he ranks 30th.

Eighteen years after Sysonby's death, a December 11, 1924 Daily Racing Form article looking back on his racing career, called Sysonby "One of Greatest Race Horses in History of the American Turf".

James Rowe, Sr. was also inducted posthumously into the Hall of Fame as a trainer.

See also
List of leading Thoroughbred racehorses

References

 The World Encyclopedia of Horse Racing: George Ennor and Bill Mooney
 The History of Thoroughbred Racing in America: William H. Robinson
 Thoroughbred Champions, online resource
 Encyclopedia Smithsonian:Famous Horses, online resource

External links
 Sysonby's pedigree with photo
 Sysonby's Hall of Fame page, with photos
 James Rowe's Hall of Fame page, with photos
 Sysonby
 The Long, Strange Post-Racing 'Career' of the Racehorse Sysonby

1902 racehorse births
1906 racehorse deaths
Racehorses bred in Kentucky
American Champion racehorses
Racehorses trained in the United States
United States Thoroughbred Racing Hall of Fame inductees
Thoroughbred family 9-h